Hana Kolarova (born 11 February 1988) is a professional triathlete from Czech Republic, based in United Kingdom. She is junior national champion 2007. and Czech Triathlon Series winner 2012.

Ironaman Competitions 
Kolarova is a challenge professional long distance triathlete. She finished her first Ironman race in 2017 at Hever Castle Triathlon and came 2.  She took part on Challenge Family Worl Championships in 2019. Apart from that, she finished 10. in Challenge Mallorca 2018, 8. in Challenge Heilbronn 2019, 8. in Challenge Davos 2019  and 13. in Challenge Mallorca 2019.

UK Elite Competitions 

She was 11th at British Elite National Championship 2017 and 9. at London Triathlon 2018

ITU Competitions 
Kolarova started competing internationally in 2005 at ETU Triathlon Junior European Championships (Alexandropolis, Greece). She took 30th place at Junior Women race and 11th at Junior Women relay. 2 years later she came 7th at ETU Triathlon Junior European Cup (Vienna, Austria) as Junior Women. Later that year she competed at Triathlon World Championships (Hamburg, Germany) and came 46th. In 2008-2011 she compete in U23 category and came 23rd at ETU Triathlon U23 European Championships (Tarzo, Italy) and 35th at ITU Triathlon World Championship Grand Final (Budapest, Hungary).

Kolarova has 17 ITU race starts. In 2012 she came 9th at ETU Cross Triathlon European Championships (Den Haag, Netherlands). Her best international triathlon result is 10th place at ITU Triathlon European Cup 2008 in Karlovy Vary (CZE).

Cycling Competitions 
Hana is also successful road cyclist and mountain biker. She won University National Championships in 2012 in road cycling. She took part at UCI road cycling World cup Gracia Orlova and Tour de Feminin in 2013. She came 3. at marathon MTB National Championships in 2013.

Personal life 
Hana is Mechanical Engineer, graduated in 2015 at the University of West Bohemia, Faculty Of Mechanical Engineering in Pilsen, Czech Republic with a Master of Engineering. She currently lives in London, United Kingdom.  She is member of German professional triathlon bundesliga team .

References

1988 births
Living people
Czech female triathletes
University of West Bohemia alumni